Henry du Pont Ridgely (born c. 1949) is a former justice of the Delaware Supreme Court who retired on January 31, 2015.

Ridgley was a descendant of Colonial Delaware Supreme Court Justice Nicholas Ridgely, who had built a mansion called Eden Hill, which had previously been acquired by the Delaware Department of Transportation. During the latter Ridgley's service on the court,  Eden Hill was refurbished for use as Ridgley's judicial chambers.

References

External links
http://judgepedia.org/Henry_Ridgely
http://www.pli.edu/Content/Faculty/Hon_Henry_duPont_Ridgely/_/N-4oZ1z135he?ID=PE980775
http://votesmart.org/candidate/biography/58844/henry-ridgely#.VB9VxhZvDWA

Living people
Justices of the Delaware Supreme Court
1949 births